Toura (Doura) is a Malayo-Polynesian language of the central southern coast of the Papuan Peninsula in Papua New Guinea.

External links 
 Paradisec has multiple collections with Toura language materials.

References

Central Papuan Tip languages
Languages of Central Province (Papua New Guinea)